Philodromus bosmansi is a spider species found in Sardinia and Algeria.

See also 
 List of Philodromidae species

References

External links 

bosmansi
Spiders described in 2004
Spiders of Europe
Spiders of Africa
Fauna of Algeria